Lophocoryza is a genus of beetles in the family Carabidae, containing the following species:

 Lophocoryza araticeps (Fairmaire, 1892)
 Lophocoryza deuvei Balkenohl, 2018
 Lophocoryza hanoti Balkenohl, 2018
 Lophocoryza sciakyi Balkenohl, 2018
 Lophocoryza sechellensis Basilewsky, 1973
 Lophocoryza vadoni Alluaud, 1941

References

Scaritinae